Tadpole Bridge is a road bridge across the River Thames in Oxfordshire, England, carrying a road between Bampton to the north and Buckland to the south. It crosses the Thames on the reach above Shifford Lock. It is a Grade II listed building.  The bridge dates from the late 18th century, the earliest reference to it being in 1784.  It is built of stone, and consists of one large arch.  There is a public house near Tadpole Bridge called The Trout. Thacker noted that at one time the legend over the door read "The Trout, kept by A. Herring". The Trout is now a hotel and gastropub.  The Thames Path crosses Tadpole Bridge.

See also
Crossings of the River Thames

References

Bridges across the River Thames
Bridges in Oxfordshire